Tyndarion may refer to the following :

 Tyndarion was an ancient name of Tindari, a city and former bishopric of Sicily, now a Latin Catholic titular see 
 Tyndarion (tyrant) was tyrant of ancient Tauromenium